Marcos Vinicius Silva Rocha Calazans (born 14 June 1996), commonly known as Marcos Calazans or Marquinhos Calazans, is a Brazilian professional footballer who plays as a winger for Série D club Bangu, on loan from Cianorte.

Career statistics

Club

Notes

External links

1996 births
Living people
Brazilian footballers
Brazilian expatriate footballers
Association football forwards
Campeonato Brasileiro Série A players
Czech First League players
Fluminense FC players
FC Slovan Liberec players
São Paulo FC players
Brazilian expatriate sportspeople in the Czech Republic
Expatriate footballers in the Czech Republic
People from Duque de Caxias, Rio de Janeiro
Sportspeople from Rio de Janeiro (state)
Campeonato Brasileiro Série D players
Cianorte Futebol Clube players
Bangu Atlético Clube players